The 2020–21 ABB FIA Formula E World Championship was the seventh season of the FIA Formula E championship, a motor racing championship for battery-electric cars recognised by motorsport's governing body, the Fédération Internationale de l'Automobile (FIA), as the highest class of competition for electric open-wheel racing cars.

With the 2020–21 season, the championship officially became a FIA World Championship, joining Formula One, the World Endurance Championship, the World Rally Championship, and the World Rallycross Championship.

The facelift of the Spark Gen2 car, called the Gen2 EVO, was supposed to debut in this season, but was delayed due to the COVID-19 pandemic, and eventually cancelled in favor of the Gen3 car.

The drivers' championship was won by Nyck de Vries, driving for Mercedes-EQ, while Mercedes won their first teams' championship.

Teams and drivers

Driver changes 
 Sam Bird and Virgin chose to part ways at the end of season six. He moved to Jaguar, replacing James Calado.
 Nick Cassidy joined Virgin to replace Sam Bird, after driving for them in the 2020 Rookie Test in Marrakesh.
 Felipe Massa left Venturi after two seasons with the team.
 René Rast was promoted to permanent driver for Audi. He had competed in the previous season's final six races in Berlin, replacing a dismissed Daniel Abt.
 Pascal Wehrlein joined TAG Heuer Porsche, replacing Neel Jani.
 Alexander Sims left BMW i Andretti Motorsport to join Mahindra Racing, replacing Jérôme d'Ambrosio, who left after 2 years with the team. Sims was joined at the team by fellow Brit Alex Lynn.
 Norman Nato joined ROKiT Venturi Racing, replacing Felipe Massa.
 Jake Dennis joined BMW i Andretti Motorsport, replacing Alexander Sims.
 Jérôme d'Ambrosio left Mahindra Racing and retired from competitive racing to become Venturi deputy team principal.
Sérgio Sette Câmara was signed by Dragon / Penske Autosport on a permanent basis, after competing in the final six races of 2020 for the team.
Tom Blomqvist replaced Ma Qinghua at NIO 333.

Mid-season changes
 Nico Müller left the series due to several clashing commitments. Joel Eriksson took his place for the remainder of the season.

Calendar
A first provisional calendar for the 2020–21 season was announced in June 2020. In October, the calendar was altered with the races in Mexico City and Sanya postponed from their original dates in February and March respectively, while a second race was added to the season opener in Santiago in January. No reason was given for the change. On 28 January FIA Formula E published a revised calendar for the first part of the season  with the addition of Formula E's first race on a permanent race circuit to take place at the Circuit Ricardo Tormo in Valencia, the return to the calendar of the Marrakesh ePrix, which was originally set to be discontinued, and the cancellation of the Season 7 running of the Paris ePrix due to the COVID-19 pandemic. Formula E also confirmed the events scheduled for Sanya and Seoul were unable to take place as originally scheduled, and both were eventually cancelled along with Marrakesh and Santiago.

ePrix locations

Calendar changes 
 The Diriyah ePrix was moved from November to February. It became the first Formula E race held at night.
 The Rome and Sanya ePrix were expected to return to the calendar, as their 2020 races were cancelled due to the COVID-19 pandemic. Only Rome was actually held, this time as a double-header, while Sanya was once again cancelled, as was the Paris ePrix.
 The Monaco ePrix returned to the calendar, as it is held every 2 years. For the first time, the Grand Prix Circuit was used.
 The Santiago ePrix was to become the first round of the season as a double-header, being held behind closed doors.  However, the round was later postponed in December 2020 owing to increased COVID-19 restrictions in the United Kingdom. It was rescheduled to June, still a double-header.  The race was eventually cancelled on 22 April 2021.
 The Valencia ePrix made its debut on the calendar, taking place at the Circuit Ricardo Tormo, which had previously hosted pre-season testing for Formula E.
 The Seoul ePrix was due to make its debut on the calendar. The race had been included on the provisional 2019–20 calendar, but was cancelled in response to the COVID-19 pandemic. The event was cancelled again on 22 April 2021.
 The Mexico City ePrix was cancelled in favor of the brand new Puebla ePrix. The event was a double race event at a permanent circuit, the Autódromo Miguel E. Abed in Amozoc de Mota, Puebla, 120 km southeast of Mexico City, as the Autódromo Hermanos Rodríguez (also a permanent circuit) was still being used as a field hospital.
 The New York City ePrix was confirmed to return as it would become a double-header once more. It was meant to become a single race event in 2020, but the race was cancelled due to the COVID-19 pandemic.
 The London ePrix returned to the calendar after a 5-year absence, using a new track layout based in the ExCeL arena. It was originally included on the 2019–20 calendar, but was cancelled due to the COVID-19 pandemic. It also became a double race event.
 The Berlin ePrix was confirmed to return and was to be a double-header once more after holding the final 6 races of the 2019–20 season due to the effects of the COVID-19 pandemic. Before the event, the format was changed so that the event would use two different layouts, making it two separate events in the process.

Regulation changes

Technical regulations
Manufacturers will now only be able to modify powertrain components once over the next two seasons as part of an extended homologation period, with teams having the option to either introduce a new powertrain for the 2020–21 season for a two-year runout or continue with their current systems for next season before homologating a new set-up for a single season the year after.

Results and standings

ePrix

Drivers' Championship
Points were awarded using the following structure:

Teams' Championship

Footnotes

References

External links 
 

2020–21 Formula E season
Formula E seasons
Formula E
FIA Formula E